A by-election was held in the federal riding of Calgary Midnapore in Alberta, Canada on 3 April 2017 following the resignation of Conservative MP and former Minister of National Defence Jason Kenney. The safe seat was held by the Conservative candidate Stephanie Kusie on an increased majority.

The by-election was scheduled to coincide with four others across the country, and was one of two to be held in the city of Calgary; Calgary Heritage.

Background

Constituency 

Calgary Midnapore covers the south-eastern corner of Calgary and is named for the Midnapore neighbourhood.

Representation 
The electoral district was created for the 2015 federal election and has had Kenney as its only MP, however predecessor ridings from which Calgary Midnapore was created mostly out of the former seat of Calgary Southeast, with smaller portions coming from Calgary Southwest and Macleod. It had, since the 1993 federal election, successively elected Reform, Canadian Alliance and Conservative MPs.

Campaign 
The riding of Calgary Midnapore was vacated by Conservative MP Jason Kenney who resigned his seat effective September 23, 2016, to seek the leadership of the Progressive Conservative Association of Alberta. 

The by-election, held on April 3, 2017, was announced on February 22, 2017. The Speaker's warrant regarding the vacancy was received on September 23, 2016. The last day a by-election could have been announced was March 22, 2017, with an election held at least 36 days afterwards.

Candidates 
Former diplomat Stephanie Kusie defeated entrepreneur Myles McDougall and local federal riding association president Jack Redekop for the Conservative nomination, held on January 14, 2017.

Haley Brown was acclaimed as the Liberal candidate on January 22.

Holly Heffernan was acclaimed as the NDP candidate on February 6.

Ryan Zedic was acclaimed as the Green Party of Canada candidate on December 8, 2016.

Results

2015 results

References 

2017 elections in Canada
2017 in Alberta
Federal by-elections in Alberta
Politics of Calgary
April 2017 events in Canada